Giovanni Garaventa (18 April 1900 - 8 August 1986) was an Italian middle-distance runner who competed at the 1924 Summer Olympics,

References

External links
 

1900 births
1986 deaths
Sportspeople from Genoa
Athletes (track and field) at the 1924 Summer Olympics
Italian male middle-distance runners
Olympic athletes of Italy